Matthias Henn (born 28 April 1985 in Birkenfeld, Rhineland-Palatinate) is a German retired footballer who played as a defender.

He spent three seasons in the Bundesliga so far, one with Eintracht Braunschweig and two with 1. FC Kaiserslautern. After eight seasons in Braunschweig, Henn joined Hansa Rostock in 2015.

References

External links
 

1985 births
Living people
People from Birkenfeld (district)
Footballers from Rhineland-Palatinate
German footballers
1. FC Kaiserslautern players
1. FC Kaiserslautern II players
Eintracht Braunschweig players
Eintracht Braunschweig II players
FC Hansa Rostock players
FC Gießen players
Association football defenders
Regionalliga players
Bundesliga players
2. Bundesliga players
3. Liga players